Encantadia: Pag-ibig Hanggang Wakas (International title: Avisala Encantadia: Love Until the End / ) is a 2006 Philippine television drama fantasy series broadcast by GMA Network. The series is the third instalment of the Encantadia franchise, and serves as a sequel to Etheria. Directed by Gil Tejada Jr., it stars Sunshine Dizon, Iza Calzado, Karylle, Diana Zubiri and Dingdong Dantes. It premiered on February 20, 2006 on the network's Telebabad line up replacing Etheria: Ang Ikalimang Kaharian ng Encantadia. The series concluded on April 28, 2006 with a total of 48 episodes.

The series is streaming online on YouTube.

Premise
The sang'gres of Encantadia - Amihan, Pirena, Alena, and Danaya return from the past after they successfully destroyed the kingdom of Etheria. In the midst of their celebration in Sapiro, Mine-a arrives and warns the Sang’gres about an impending danger that only they can solve.

Cast and characters

Lead cast
 Sunshine Dizon as Pirena
 Iza Calzado as Amihan
 Diana Zubiri as Danaya
 Karylle as Alena
 Dingdong Dantes as Ybrahim

Supporting cast
 Alessandra de Rossi as Andora
 Francine Prieto as Avria
 Jopay Paguia as Juvila
 Pauleen Luna as Odessa
 Jackie Rice as Armea
 Marky Cielo as Arman
 Pen Medina as Hagorn
 Angel Aquino as Ether
 Benjie Paras as Wahid
 Alfred Vargas as Aquil
 Jay-R as Azulan
 Marky Lopez as Wantuk
 Justin Cuyugan as Arkrey
 Michael Roy Jornales as Apek
 Ella Guevara as Cassandra
 Kristine Gonzales as Violeta
 Katrina Gonzales as Luntian
 Marnie Lapuz as Rosas
 Arthur Solinap as Muros
 Raul Dillo as Kahel
 Noel Urbano as the voice of Imaw, Aegen and Dilawan

Guest cast
 Dawn Zulueta as Minea
 Cindy Kurleto as Cassiopea
 Jennylyn Mercado as Lira / Milagros
 Chinggoy Alonzo as Evades
 Raymond Bagatsing as Emre
 Cheska Iñigo as Galatea
 Geneva Cruz as Sari-a
 JM Reyes as young Arman
 Richard Gomez as Raquim
 Precious Lara Quigaman as adult Cassandra

Finale special
On April 23, 2006, a television special Avisala Encantadia! was aired. It was the first farewell special that GMA Network had created for a television series.

References

External links
 
 

2006 Philippine television series debuts
2006 Philippine television series endings
Encantadia
Fantaserye and telefantasya
Filipino-language television shows
GMA Network drama series
Sequel television series